Sheepshead Bay High School is a defunct public high school in Brooklyn, New York City, New York. Closed in 2016, the building currently operates as Frank J. Macchiarola Educational Complex, housing several smaller high schools.

History 
Sheepshead Bay High School was a large, multi-cultural high school in Brooklyn, New York City that closed in 2016. SBHS opened in 1959, welcoming ninth to twelfth grade students. The first graduating class was 1961.

Closure 
On March 12, 2013, the New York City Department of Education's Panel For Educational Policy voted to approve plans to phase out Sheepshead Bay High School and introduce four new schools.

Notable alumni 
Randall Amster (1984) – author, professor
Elayne Boosler (1969) – actress, comedian
Frank Brooks (circa 1996) – MLB player
Duval Clear a.k.a. Masta Ace (circa 1984) – rapper
Larry David (1965) – comedian; film/television producer/writer 
Warren Davis (1973) – Q*bert designer/programmer 
Terry Gross (1968) – radio talk-show host
Howard Kurtz (1970) – journalist
Katorah Marrero a/k/a Young M.A (2010) – rapper
Anthony Melchiorri – hospitality expert and television personality 
Donna Pescow (1972) – actress
Rico Petrocelli (1961) – MLB player
Fred Stoller – stand-up comedian/voice artist/writer
 Mark Turenshine (1944-2016) - American-Israeli basketball player
Kelly Wallace (1983) – television news correspondent
 Glenn Thrush, New York Times White House correspondent

Notable faculty

 Dov Markus (born 1946) - Israeli-American soccer player

References

External links

Public high schools in Brooklyn
Sheepshead Bay, Brooklyn